A filibuster is a tactic used in the U.S. Senate to delay or block a vote on a measure by preventing debate on it from ending. The Senate's rules place few restrictions on debate; in general, if no other senator is speaking, a senator who seeks recognition is entitled to speak for as long as they wish. Only when debate concludes can the measure be put to a vote. Rule XXII of the Standing Rules of the Senate allows the Senate to vote to limit debate by invoking cloture on the pending question. In most cases, however, this requires a majority of three-fifths of senators duly chosen and sworn, so a minority of senators can block a measure, even if it has the support of a simple majority. 

Originally, the Senate's rules did not provide for a procedure for the Senate to vote to end debate on a question so that it could be voted on. The minority could therefore extend debate on a bill indefinitely by holding the floor of the Senate, preventing the bill from coming to a vote. Throughout the 19th century, senators attempted to introduce the hour rule and the previous question (both of which are used in the United States House of Representatives to limit debate), but these attempts were unsuccessful. Finally, in 1917, at the urging of President Woodrow Wilson, in response to a filibuster of the Armed Ship Bill, the Senate adopted a rule allowing for cloture of a debate. Initially, this required a majority of two-thirds of senators present and voting. Between 1949 and 1959, the threshold for cloture was two-thirds of senators duly chosen and sworn. In 1975, this threshold was reduced to three-fifths of senators duly chosen and sworn (60 votes if there is no more than one vacancy).

Even once cloture has been invoked, in most cases debate can continue for a further 30 hours, and most bills are subject to two or three filibusters before the Senate can vote on passage of it (first on a motion to proceed to the consideration of the bill, then potentially on a substitute amendment to the bill, and finally on the bill itself). Even bills supported by 60 or more senators (as well as nominations) may therefore be delayed by a filibuster. A filibuster can also be conducted through the use of other dilatory measures, such as proposing dilatory amendments.

In the 1970s, following the filibuster of several civil rights bills, the Senate adopted a "two-track" system, which was intended in part as a progressive reform to prevent filibusters from completely blocking Senate business. Since then, however, a measure could be delayed simply by a senator placing a hold on it; in this case, the leadership will generally not attempt to advance the measure unless cloture is invoked on it (usually by a 60-vote majority). For example, as a courtesy to senators who have holds on a bill, senators generally suggest the absence of a quorum after they finish their speeches, which has the effect of preventing the presiding officer from putting the pending question to the Senate even though no senator seeks recognition. Thus, in practice, most bills cannot pass the Senate without the support of at least 60 senators.

In 2013, the Senate overturned a ruling of the chair to set a precedent that only a simple majority is needed to invoke cloture on nominations other than those to the Supreme Court of the United States. In 2017, the Senate overturned a ruling of the chair to set a precedent that this also applies to nominations to the Supreme Court. These changes were made by using the nuclear option, which allows the Senate to override its Standing Rules (such as the 60-vote cloture threshold) by a simple majority, even though under the regular order, a two-thirds majority of senators present and voting would be needed to invoke cloture on a resolution amending the Standing Rules. Since then, nominations can be confirmed without the support of 60 senators.

Moreover, a number of rulemaking statutes have been enacted to limit the scope of the filibuster by imposing an automatic time limit on Senate debate of certain questions. These include the Congressional Budget and Impoundment Control Act of 1974 (which created the budget reconciliation process), the Congressional Review Act and the War Powers Resolution. Since debate on these measures ends without cloture being invoked, they are not subject to the 60-vote threshold.

History

Constitutional design
Only a small number of supermajority requirements were explicitly included in the original U.S. Constitution, including conviction on impeachment (two-thirds of senators present), agreeing to a resolution of advice and consent to ratification of a treaty (two-thirds of senators present), expelling a member of Congress (two-thirds of members voting in the house in question), overriding presidential vetoes (two-thirds of members voting of both houses), and proposing constitutional amendments (two-thirds of members voting of both houses), Through negative textual implication, the Constitution also gives a simple majority the power to set procedural rules: "Each House may determine the Rules of its Proceedings, punish its Members for disorderly Behavior, and, with the Concurrence of two thirds, expel a Member."

In Federalist No. 22, Alexander Hamilton described super-majority requirements as being one of the main problems with the previous Articles of Confederation, and identified several evils which would result from such a requirement:

"To give a minority a negative upon the majority (which is always the case where more than a majority is requisite to a decision), is, in its tendency, to subject the sense of the greater number to that of the lesser. ... The necessity of unanimity in public bodies, or of something approaching towards it, has been founded upon a supposition that it would contribute to security. But its real operation is to embarrass the administration, to destroy the energy of the government, and to substitute the pleasure, caprice, or artifices of an insignificant, turbulent, or corrupt junto, to the regular deliberations and decisions of a respectable majority. In those emergencies of a nation, in which the goodness or badness, the weakness or strength of its government, is of the greatest importance, there is commonly a necessity for action. The public business must, in some way or other, go forward. If a pertinacious minority can control the opinion of a majority, respecting the best mode of conducting it, the majority, in order that something may be done, must conform to the views of the minority; and thus the sense of the smaller number will overrule that of the greater, and give a tone to the national proceedings. Hence, tedious delays; continual negotiation and intrigue; contemptible compromises of the public good. And yet, in such a system, it is even happy when such compromises can take place: for upon some occasions things will not admit of accommodation; and then the measures of government must be injuriously suspended, or fatally defeated. It is often, by the impracticability of obtaining the concurrence of the necessary number of votes, kept in a state of inaction. Its situation must always savor of weakness, sometimes border upon anarchy.”

Early use of the filibuster
In 1789, the first U.S. Senate adopted rules that did not provide for a cloture mechanism, which opened the door to filibusters. Indeed, a filibuster took place at the very first session of the Senate. On September 22, 1789, Senator William Maclay wrote in his diary that the “design of the Virginians . . . was to talk away the time, so that we could not get the bill passed.”

During most of the pre-Civil War period, the filibuster was seldom used, as northern senators desired to maintain southern support over fears of disunion/secession and made compromises over slavery in order to avoid confrontation with new states admitted to the Union in pairs to preserve the sectional balance in the Senate, most notably in the Missouri Compromise of 1820.

One of the early notable filibusters occurred in 1837 when a group of Whig senators filibustered to prevent allies of the Democratic President Andrew Jackson from expunging a resolution of censure against him. In 1841, a defining moment came during debate on a bill to charter a new national bank. After Whig Senator Henry Clay tried to end the debate via a majority vote, Democratic Senator William R. King threatened a filibuster, saying that Clay "may make his arrangements at his boarding house for the winter."  Other senators sided with King, and Clay backed down.

Although between 1789 and 1806 the Senate's rules provided for a motion for the previous question, this motion was itself debatable, so it could not be used as an effective cloture mechanism. Rather, it was used by the Senate to reverse its decision to consider a bill (much like today's motion to indefinitely postpone). Starting in 1811, the House of Representatives set a series of precedents to make the previous question a way of limiting debate, and throughout the 19th century, some senators unsuccessfully attempted to introduce this version of the previous question into the Senate rules.

The emergence of cloture (1917–1969) 

In 1917, during World War I, at the urging of President Woodrow Wilson, the Senate adopted a rule by a vote of 76–3 to permit an end to debate on a measure in the form of cloture. This took place after a group of 12 anti-war senators managed to kill a bill that would have allowed Wilson to arm merchant vessels in the face of unrestricted German submarine warfare. At any time, a senator could present a cloture motion signed by 16 senators while a measure was pending. One hour after the Senate convened on the second calendar day of session following the filing of the cloture motion, the business then pending would be set aside, and the presiding officer would put to the Senate the question, "Is it the sense of the Senate that the debate shall be brought to a close?" If two-thirds of senators present and voting voted in favor of cloture, the measure would be the unfinished business to the exclusion of all other business; no dilatory motions or amendments would be allowed; all amendments must have been submitted prior to the cloture vote, and each senator would be limited to 1 hour of debate (which must be germane to the clotured measure).

Despite the new supermajority requirement, however, political scientist David Mayhew has argued that in practice, it was unclear whether a filibuster could be sustained against majority opposition. The first cloture vote occurred in 1919 to end debate on the Treaty of Versailles, leading to the treaty's rejection against the wishes of the cloture rule's first champion, President Wilson. During the 1930s, Senator Huey Long of Louisiana used the filibuster to promote his populist policies. He recited Shakespeare and read out recipes for "pot-likkers" during his filibusters, which occupied 15 hours of debate. 

In 1946, five Democrats, senators John H. Overton (LA), Richard B. Russell (GA), Millard E. Tydings (MD), Clyde R. Hoey (NC), and Kenneth McKellar (TN), blocked a vote on a bill (S. 101) proposed by Democrat Dennis Chávez of New Mexico that would have created a permanent Fair Employment Practice Committee (FEPC) to prevent discrimination in the workplace. The filibuster lasted weeks, and Senator Chávez was forced to remove the bill from consideration after a failed cloture vote, even though he had enough votes to pass the bill.

In 1949, in response to filibusters of motions to amend the Journal and motions to proceed to the consideration of bills, the cloture rule was amended to allow cloture to be filed on 'any measure, motion, or other matter pending before the Senate, or the unfinished business'.

In 1949, the Senate made invoking cloture more difficult by requiring two-thirds of senators duly chosen and sworn to vote in favor of a cloture motion.  Moreover, future proposals to change the Senate rules were themselves specifically exempted from being subject to cloture.  In 1953, Senator Wayne Morse of Oregon set a record by filibustering for 22 hours and 26 minutes while protesting the Tidelands Oil legislation. Then-Democratic Senator Strom Thurmond of South Carolina broke this record in 1957 by filibustering the Civil Rights Act of 1957 for 24 hours and 18 minutes, during which he read laws from different states and recited George Washington's farewell address in its entirety, although the bill ultimately passed.

In 1959, anticipating more civil rights legislation, the Senate under the leadership of Majority Leader Lyndon Johnson restored the cloture threshold to two-thirds of senators present and voting.  Although the 1949 rule had eliminated cloture on rules changes themselves, the resolution was not successfully filibustered, and on January 5, 1959, the resolution was adopted by a 72–22 vote with the support of three top Democrats and three of the four top Republicans.

The presiding officer, Vice President Richard Nixon, stated his opinion that the Senate "has a constitutional right at the beginning of each new Congress to determine rules it desires to follow". However, since this was a response to a parliamentary inquiry, rather than a ruling on a point of order, it is not binding precedent, and the prevailing view is that the Senate's rules continue from one Congress to another. The 1959 change also eliminated the 1949 exemption for rules changes, allowing cloture to once again be invoked on future changes.

One of the most notable filibusters of the 1960s occurred when Southern Democrats attempted to block the passage of the Civil Rights Act of 1964 by filibustering for 75 hours, including a 14-hour-and-13-minute address by Senator Robert Byrd of West Virginia. The filibuster failed when the Senate successfully invoked cloture for only the second time since 1927.

From 1917 to 1970, the Senate took a cloture vote nearly once a year (on average); during this time, there were a total of 49 cloture votes.

The two-track system, 60-vote rule and rise of the routine filibuster (1970 onward)
After a series of filibusters in the 1960s over civil rights legislation, the Senate put a "two-track system" into place in 1972 under the leadership of Democratic Majority Leader Mike Mansfield and Democratic Majority Whip Robert Byrd. Before this system was introduced, a filibuster would stop the Senate from moving on to any other legislative activity. Tracking allows the majority leader—with unanimous consent or the agreement of the minority leader—to have more than one main motion pending on the floor as unfinished business. Under the two-track system, the Senate can have two or more pieces of legislation or nominations pending on the floor simultaneously by designating specific periods during the day when each one will be considered.

The notable side effect of this change was that by no longer bringing Senate business to a complete halt, filibusters on particular motions became politically easier for the minority to sustain. As a result, the number of filibusters began increasing rapidly, eventually leading to the modern era in which an effective supermajority requirement exists to pass legislation, with no practical requirement that the minority party actually hold the floor or extend debate.

In 1975, the Senate revised its cloture rule so that three-fifths of senators duly chosen and sworn could limit debate, except for changing Senate rules which still requires a two-thirds majority of those present and voting to invoke cloture. 

However, by returning to an absolute number of all senators, rather than a proportion of those present and voting, the change also made any filibusters easier to sustain on the floor by a small number of senators from the minority party without requiring the presence of their minority colleagues. This further reduced the majority's leverage to force an issue through extended debate.

In 1977, the Senate set a series of precedents holding that if cloture has been invoked on a measure, the presiding officer must take the initiative in ruling nongermane amendments out of order.

Another tactic, which used points of order to delay legislation because they were not counted as part of the limited time allowed for debate, was rendered ineffective by a rule change in 1979.

At first, the only effect of cloture on the time available for debate was to limit each senator to one hour of debate. In 1979, the Senate imposed a 100-hour limit on the total time available for consideration of a clotured measure. In 1986, this was reduced to 30 hours.

As the filibuster has evolved from a rare practice that required holding the floor for extended periods into a routine 60-vote supermajority requirement, Senate leaders have increasingly used cloture motions as a regular tool to manage the flow of business, often even in the absence of a threatened filibuster. Thus, the presence or absence of cloture attempts is not necessarily a reliable indicator of the presence or absence of a threatened filibuster. Because filibustering does not depend on the use of any specific rules, whether a filibuster is present is always a matter of judgment.

Abolition for nominations: since 2005

In 2005, a group of Republican senators led by Majority Leader Bill Frist proposed having the presiding officer, Vice President Dick Cheney, rule that a filibuster on judicial nominees was unconstitutional, as it was inconsistent with the President's power to name judges with the advice and consent of a simple majority of senators. Senator Trent Lott, the junior senator from Mississippi, used the word "nuclear" to describe the plan, and so it became known as the "nuclear option," and the term thereafter came to refer to the general process of changing cloture requirements via the establishment of a new Senate precedent (by simple majority vote, as opposed to formally amending the Senate rule by two-thirds vote). However, a group of 14 senators—seven Democrats and seven Republicans, collectively dubbed the "Gang of 14"—reached an agreement to temporarily defuse the conflict.

From April to June 2010, under Democratic control, the Senate Committee on Rules and Administration held a series of monthly public hearings on the history and use of the filibuster in the Senate. 

During the 113th Congress, two packages of amendments were adopted on January 25, 2013, one temporary for that Congress and one permanent. Firstly, during the 113th Congress, debate on motions to proceed to bills would be limited to 4 hours, and the minority would be guaranteed the opportunity to offer amendments. Postcloture debate time on district judge nominations was limited to 2 hours, and postcloture debate time on executive nominations (other than those at Level I of the Executive Schedule) was limited to 8 hours. Permanent changes to the Standing Rules of the Senate provided for a simplified cloture procedure for bipartisan motions to proceed and for compound motions to go to conference.

Despite these modest changes, 60 votes were still required to overcome a filibuster, and the "silent filibuster"—in which a senator can delay a bill even if they leave the floor—remained in place.

On November 21, 2013, Senate Democrats used the nuclear option, voting 48–52 to overrule a decision of the chair and eliminate the use of the filibuster on executive branch nominees and judicial nominees, except to the Supreme Court. All Republicans and three Democrats voted in favor of sustaining the decision of the chair. The Democrats' stated motivation was what they saw as an expansion of filibustering by Republicans during the Obama administration, especially with respect to nominations for the United States Court of Appeals for the District of Columbia Circuit and out of frustration with filibusters of executive branch nominees for agencies such as the Federal Housing Finance Agency.

On April 6, 2017, Senate Republicans eliminated the sole exception to the 2013 change by invoking the nuclear option to extend the 2013 precedent to include Supreme Court nominees. This was done in order to allow a simple majority to confirm Neil Gorsuch to the Supreme Court. The vote was 48–52 against sustaining the decision of the chair on a point of order raised by Majority Leader Mitch McConnell. 61 Senators from both parties later wrote a letter to Senate leadership, urging them to preserve the filibuster for legislation.

In 2019, the Senate voted 49–51 to overturn a ruling of the chair to set a precedent that postcloture debate on nominations, other than those to the Supreme Court of the United States, to the United States courts of appeals and to positions at Level I of the Executive Schedule, is two hours. All Republicans except Senators Susan Collins and Mike Lee voted against sustaining the decision of the chair.

In January 2021, following a shift to a 50-50 Democratic majority supported by Vice President Harris's tie-breaking vote, the legislative filibuster became a sticking point for the adoption of a new organizing resolution when Mitch McConnell, the Senate Minority Leader, threatened to filibuster the organizing resolution until it should include language maintaining a 60-vote threshold to invoke cloture. As a result of this delay, committee memberships were held over from the 116th Congress, leaving some committees without a chair, some committees chaired by Republicans, and new Senators without committee assignments. After a stalemate that lasted a week, McConnell received assurances from two Democratic senators that they would continue to support the 60-vote threshold. Because of those assurances, on January 25, 2021, McConnell abandoned his threat of a filibuster.

Exceptions
A number of laws limit the time for debate on certain bills, effectively exempting those bills from the 60-vote requirement, and allow the Senate to pass those bills by simple majority vote. As a result, many major legislative actions in recent decades have been adopted through one of these methods, especially reconciliation.

Budget reconciliation
Budget reconciliation is a procedure created in 1974 as part of the congressional budget process. In brief, the annual budget process begins with adoption of a budget resolution (passed by simple majority in each house, not signed by President, does not carry force of law) that sets overall funding levels for the government. The Senate may then consider a budget reconciliation bill, not subject to filibuster, that reconciles funding amounts in any annual appropriations bills with the amounts specified in the budget resolution. 

However, under the Byrd rule no non-budgetary "extraneous matter" may be considered in a reconciliation bill. The presiding officer, relying always on the opinion of the Senate parliamentarian, determines whether an item is extraneous, and a 60-vote majority is required to include such material in a reconciliation bill.

During periods of single-party control in Congress and the Presidency, reconciliation has increasingly been used to enact major parts of a party's legislative agenda by avoiding the 60-vote rule. Notable examples of such successful use include:

 Omnibus Budget Reconciliation Act of 1993,  (1993)  The Clinton budget bill, passed the Senate 51–50. Raised income taxes on those making over $115,000, among other tax increases.
 Economic Growth and Tax Relief Reconciliation Act of 2001 (EGTRRA),  (2001)  First set of Bush tax cuts, passed the Senate 58–33.
 Jobs and Growth Tax Relief Reconciliation Act of 2003,  (2003)  Accelerated and extended Bush tax cuts, passed the Senate 51–50.
 Deficit Reduction Act of 2005,  (2006)  Slowed growth in Medicare and Medicaid spending and changed student loan formulas, passed the Senate 51–50.
 Tax Increase Prevention and Reconciliation Act of 2005 (TIPRA),  (2006)  Extended lower rates on capital gains and relief from the alternative minimum tax, passed the Senate 54–44.
 Health Care and Education Reconciliation Act of 2010,  (2010)  Second portion of Obamacare, passed the Senate 56–43. This law made budget-related amendments to the main Obamacare law, the Patient Protection and Affordable Care Act which had previously passed with 60 votes. It also included significant student loan changes.
 Tax Cuts and Jobs Act of 2017 (2017)  Trump tax cuts, passed the Senate 51–48.
 American Rescue Plan Act of 2021 (2021)  COVID-19 relief, passed the Senate 50–49
 Inflation Reduction Act of 2022 (2022)  Climate change funding, Medicare prescription drug price negotiations, and creation of a corporate minimum tax, passed the Senate 51–50.

Trade promotion authority
Beginning in 1975 with the Trade Act of 1974, and later through the Trade Act of 2002 and the Trade Preferences Extension Act of 2015, Congress has from time to time provided so-called "fast track" authority for the President to negotiate international trade agreements. After the President submits an agreement, Congress can then approve or deny the agreement, but cannot amend it nor filibuster. On the House and Senate floors, each body can debate the bill for no more than 20 hours, thus the Senate can act by simple majority vote once the time for debate has expired.

Congressional Review Act
The Congressional Review Act, enacted in 1995, allows Congress to review and repeal administrative regulations adopted by the Executive Branch within 60 legislative days. This procedure will most typically be used successfully shortly after a party change in the presidency. It was used once in 2001 to repeal an ergonomics rule promulgated under Bill Clinton, was not used in 2009, and was used 14 times in 2017 to repeal various regulations adopted in the final year of the Barack Obama presidency.

The Act provides that a rule disapproved by Congress "may not be reissued in substantially the same form" until Congress expressly authorizes it. However, CRA disapproval resolutions require only 51 votes while a new authorization for the rule would require 60 votes. Thus, the CRA effectively functions as a "one-way ratchet" against the subject matter of the rule in question being re-promulgated, such as by the administration of a future President of the opposing party.

National Emergencies Act
The National Emergencies Act, enacted in 1976, formalizes the emergency powers of the President. The law requires that when a joint resolution to terminate an emergency has been introduced, it must be considered on the floor within a specified number of days. The time limitation overrides the normal 60-vote requirement to close debate, and thereby permits a joint resolution to be passed by a simple majority of both the House and Senate.  

As originally designed, such joint resolutions were not subject to presidential veto. Following the Supreme Court's decision in INS v. Chadha (1983) which ruled that the legislative veto was unconstitutional, Congress revised the law in 1985 to make the joint resolutions subject to presidential veto.

War Powers Resolution
The War Powers Resolution, enacted in 1973 over Richard Nixon's veto, generally requires the President to withdraw troops committed overseas within 60 days, which the President may extend once for 30 additional days, unless Congress has declared war, otherwise authorized the use of force, or is unable to meet as a result of an armed attack upon the United States. Both the House and Senate must vote on any joint resolution authorizing forces, or requiring that forces be removed, within a specified time period, thus establishing a simple-majority threshold in the Senate.

Confirmations
On November 21, 2013, the Senate, using the "nuclear option," created a binding precedent to eliminate the use of the filibuster on executive branch nominees and judicial nominees, except those to the Supreme Court. The Democrats' stated motivation was what they saw as an expansion of filibustering by Republicans during the Obama administration, especially with respect to nominations for the United States Court of Appeals for the District of Columbia Circuit, and out of frustration with filibusters of executive branch nominees for agencies such as the Federal Housing Finance Agency. On April 6, 2017, the exception for Supreme Court appointments was also eliminated.

Institutional effects

The modern-era filibuster—and the effective 60-vote supermajority requirement it has led to—has had significant policy and political effects on all three branches of the federal government.

Congress
The supermajority rule has made it very difficult, often impossible, for Congress to pass any but the most non-controversial legislation in recent decades. The number of bills passed by the Senate has cratered: in the 85th Congress in 1957–59, over 25% of all bills introduced in the Senate were eventually passed into law; by 2005, that number had fallen to 12.5%, and by 2010, only 2.8% of introduced bills became law—a 90% decline from 50 years prior. 

During times of unified party control, majorities have attempted (with varying levels of success) to enact their major policy priorities through the budget reconciliation process, resulting in legislation constrained by more narrow, budgetary rules (e.g., any legislation that includes provisions on social security may be filibustered, so the Senate cannot address it). Meanwhile, public approval for Congress as an institution has fallen to its lowest levels ever, with large segments of the public seeing the institution as ineffective. 

Shifting majorities of both parties—and their supporters—have often been frustrated as major policy priorities articulated in political campaigns are unable to obtain passage following an election. Despite the Democratic Party holding a substantial majority in the 111th Congress, the "public option" provision in the Affordable Care Act was removed because one Senator—Joe Lieberman of Connecticut—threatened to filibuster the bill if it remained.

Presidency
Presidents of both parties have increasingly filled the policymaking vacuum with expanded use of executive power, including executive orders in areas that had traditionally been handled through legislation. For example, Barack Obama effected major changes in immigration policy by issuing work permits to some undocumented workers, while Donald Trump issued several significant executive orders after taking office in 2017, along with undoing many of Obama's initiatives. As a result, policy in these areas is increasingly determined by executive preference, and is more easily changed after elections, rather than through more permanent legislative policy.

Judiciary
The Supreme Court's caseload has declined significantly, with various commenters suggesting that the decline in major legislation has been a major cause. Meanwhile, more policy issues are resolved judicially without action by Congress—despite the existence of potential simple majority support in the Senate—on topics such as the legalization of same-sex marriage.

Impact on major presidential policy initiatives
The implied threat of a filibuster—and the resulting 60-vote requirement in the modern era—have had major impacts on the ability of recent Presidents to enact their top legislative priorities into law. The effects of the 60-vote requirement are most apparent in periods where the President and both Houses of Congress are controlled by the same political party, typically in the first two years of a presidential term.

Bill Clinton
In 1993–94, President Bill Clinton enjoyed Democratic majorities in both chambers of the 103rd Congress, including a 57–43 advantage in the Senate. Yet the Clinton health care plan of 1993, formulated by a task force led by First Lady Hillary Clinton, was unable to pass in part due to the filibuster. As early as April 1993, a memo to the task force noted that "While the substance is obviously controversial, there is apparently great disquiet in the Capitol over whether we understand the interactivity between reconciliation and health, procedurally, and in terms of timing and counting votes for both measures..."

George W. Bush
In 2001, President George W. Bush was unable to obtain sufficient Democratic support for his tax cut proposals. As a result, the Bush tax cuts of 2001 and 2003 were each passed using reconciliation, which required that the tax cuts expire within the 10-year budget window to avoid violating the Byrd rule in the Senate. The status of the tax cuts would remain unresolved until the late 2012 "fiscal cliff," with a  portion of the cuts being made permanent by the American Taxpayer Relief Act of 2012, passed by a Republican Congress and signed by President Barack Obama.

Barack Obama
In 2009–10, President Barack Obama briefly enjoyed an effective 60-vote Democratic majority (including independents) in the Senate during the 111th Congress. During that time period, the Senate passed the Patient Protection and Affordable Care Act (ACA), commonly known as "Obamacare," on December 24, 2009 by a vote of 60-39 (after invoking cloture by the same 60-39 margin). However, Obama's proposal to create a public health insurance option was removed from the health care legislation because it could not command 60-vote support.

House Democrats did not approve of all aspects of the Senate bill, but after 60-vote Senate control was permanently lost in February 2010 due to the election of Scott Brown to fill the seat of the late Ted Kennedy, House Democrats decided to pass the Senate bill intact and it became law. Several House-desired modifications to the Senate bill—those sufficient to pass scrutiny under the Byrd rule—were then made under reconciliation via the Health Care and Education Reconciliation Act of 2010, which was enacted days later following a 56–43 vote in the Senate.

The near-60-vote Senate majority that Democrats held throughout the 111th Congress was also critical to passage of other major Obama initiatives, including the American Reinvestment and Recovery Act of 2009 (passed 60–38, three Republicans voting yes), and the Dodd-Frank Wall Street Reform and Consumer Protection Act (passed 60–39, three Republicans voting yes, one Democrat voting no). However, the House-passed American Clean Energy and Security Act, which would have created a cap-and-trade system and established a national renewable electricity standard to combat climate change, never received a Senate floor vote with Majority Leader Harry Reid saying, "It's easy to count to 60."

In protest of the extraordinary powers granted to the Executive in the Patriot Act, Senator Rand Paul staged a 13-hour filibuster, during the Senate confirmation hearings for CIA director John Brennan in March, 2013.  He demanded a written confirmation that the executive would not engage in extrajudicial killings of American citizens on US soil. Attorney General Holder wrote a letter, which secretary Carney read at a press conference, indicating president Obama's support, "The president has not and would not use drone strikes against American citizens on American soil."

Donald Trump
In 2017, President Donald Trump and the 115th Congress pursued a strategy to use an FY17 reconciliation bill to repeal the ACA, followed by an FY18 reconciliation bill to pass tax reform. A budget reconciliation strategy was pursued since nearly all Democrats were expected to oppose these policies, making a filibuster threat insurmountable due to the 60-vote requirement.

An FY17 budget resolution that included reconciliation instructions for health care reform was passed by the Senate by a 51–48 vote on January 12, 2017, and by the House on a 227–198 vote the following day. The House later passed the American Health Care Act of 2017 as the FY17 budget reconciliation bill by a vote of 217–213 on May 4, 2017. In July, the Senate Parliamentarian ruled that certain provisions of the House bill must be stricken (as "extraneous" non-budgetary matter) under the Byrd rule before proceeding under reconciliation. The Parliamentarian later ruled that an FY17 reconciliation bill must be adopted by the end of FY17, establishing a September 30 deadline. Senate Republicans were unable to obtain 51 votes for any health care reconciliation bill before the deadline, and the FY17 budget resolution expired.

An FY18 budget resolution that included reconciliation instructions for tax reform was passed by the Senate by a 51–49 vote on October 19, 2017, and by the House on a 216–212 vote on October 26, 2017. It permitted raising the deficit by $1.5 trillion over ten years and opening drilling in the Arctic National Wildlife Refuge, the latter to help secure the eventual vote of Alaska Sen. Lisa Murkowski who voted against FY17 health care reconciliation legislation. The Senate later passed the Tax Cuts and Jobs Act of 2017 (unofficial title) as the FY18 reconciliation bill by a 51–48 vote on December 20, 2017, with final passage by the House on a 224–201 vote later that day. Due to the budget resolution's cap of $1.5 trillion in additional deficits over 10 years, plus Byrd rule limits on adding deficits beyond 10 years, the corporate tax cut provisions were made permanent while many of the individual tax cuts expire after 2025.

President Trump repeatedly called on Senate Republicans to abolish or reform the filibuster throughout 2017 and 2018.

Joe Biden
The 117th United States Congress began with Republican control of the Senate on January 3, 2021. Two days later, Georgia Senators Jon Ossoff (D) and Raphael Warnock (D) were elected in runoff elections, resulting in a 50–50 tie. Democrats became the majority party when Ossoff, Warnock, and Alex Padilla (D-CA) were sworn in on January 20. Vice President Kamala Harris had been sworn in a few hours earlier. However, reorganization of the Senate and Democratic control of committees (hence confirmation of Biden Administration nominees) and hearings on legislation were delayed until February 3. The agreement meant that committee votes that ended in ties would go to the full Senate. Senators Joe Manchin (D-WV) and Kyrsten Sinema (D-AZ) promised not to vote to end the filibuster. 

U.S. Senator Kyrsten Sinema explained her opposition in June 2021, claiming that ending the filibuster would lead to "repeated radical reversals in federal policy, cementing uncertainty, deepening divisions, and further eroding Americans’ confidence in our government." President Biden expressed support for reforming or abolishing the filibuster after Senate Republicans led by Mitch McConnell blocked the Freedom to Vote Act along party lines on October 20, 2021. 

On January 20, 2022, the Senate voted against overturning a ruling of the chair to block all motions, points of order and amendments to a voting rights bill, which would have allowed a talking filibuster on the bill without any hindrances. Every Republican senator voted against this use of the nuclear option along with Senators Manchin and Sinema.

Proposals for reform
In addition to elimination (either wholly or for certain matters), several procedural alternatives have been proposed to modify or reform the filibuster rule.

Talking filibuster
Some reformers argue that the filibuster should be returned to its origins, in which senators were required to hold the floor and speak at length to delay a bill. Since obstruction would be more visible, the reform might benefit major bills that the minority "is willing to block covertly but not overtly". For example, a 2012 proposal by Sen. Jeff Merkley (D-OR) would require that if between 51 and 59 senators support a cloture motion, debate would continue only until there is no opposing Senator speaking. At that point, another cloture vote would be triggered with only a simple majority to pass.

Gradually lowering the 60-vote threshold
In 2013, Sen. Tom Harkin (D-IA) advocated for steadily reducing the cloture threshold each time a cloture vote fails. The number of votes required would be reduced by three on each vote (e.g., from 60 to 57, 54, 51) until a simple majority was required. Harkin envisioned that this rule would still allow the minority to bring visibility to and slow down a bill, and since the whole process would take eight days the majority would have incentive to compromise with the minority. The Senate defeated the idea by voice vote in 2013.

Minority bill of rights
As an alternative to blocking the majority's agenda, some proposals have focused instead on granting the minority the right to have its own agenda considered on the floor. For example, in 2004 then-House Minority Leader Nancy Pelosi (D-CA) proposed a "minority bill of rights" for the House of Representatives that would have guaranteed the minority the right to offer its own alternatives to bills under consideration. The House Republican majority did not endorse her proposal, and Pelosi in turn did not grant those rights when Democrats took control of the House in 2007.

Process for limiting or eliminating the filibuster
According to the Supreme Court's ruling in United States v. Ballin (1892), Senate rules can be changed by a simple majority vote. Nevertheless, under current Senate rules, a rule change could itself be filibustered, requiring two-thirds of senators who are present and voting to end debate. (This differs from the usual requirement for three-fifths of sworn senators.)

Nuclear option

Despite the two-thirds requirement described above being written into the Senate rules, any Senator may attempt to nullify a Senate rule, starting by making a point of order that the rule is unconstitutional or just that the meaning of the rule should not be followed. The presiding officer is generally expected to rule in favor of the rules of the Senate, but under rule XX, "every appeal therefrom shall be decided at once, and without debate" and therefore by a simple majority as there is no need for a vote on cloture.

Procedure to invoke the nuclear option

This happened in 2013, when Harry Reid of the Democratic Party raised a point of order that "the vote on cloture under rule XXII for all nominations other than for the Supreme Court of the United States is by majority vote". The presiding officer overruled the point of order, and Reid appealed the ruling. Mitch McConnell of the Republican Party raised a parliamentary inquiry on how many votes were required to appeal the chair's ruling in that instance. The presiding officer replied, "A majority of those Senators voting, a quorum being present, is required." Reid's appeal was sustained by a 48–52 vote, and the presiding officer then ruled that the Senate had established a precedent that cloture on nominations other than those for the Supreme Court requires only a simple majority.

Procedurally, the events described went as follows:

Mr. REID. I raise a point of order that the vote on cloture under rule XXII for all nominations other than for the Supreme Court of the United States is by majority vote.
The PRESIDENT pro tempore. Under the rules, the point of order is not sustained.
Mr. REID. I appeal the ruling of the Chair and ask for the yeas and nays.
(48–52 vote on upholding ruling of the chair)
The PRESIDENT pro tempore. The decision of the Chair is not sustained.
The PRESIDENT pro tempore. *** Under the precedent set by the Senate today, November 21, 2013, the threshold for cloture on nominations, not including those to the Supreme Court of the United States, is now a majority. That is the ruling of the Chair.

A new precedent was thus established allowing for cloture to be invoked by a simple majority on executive nominations, excluding those to the Supreme Court of the United States.

On April 6, 2017, that precedent was further changed by McConnell and the Republican majority, in a 48–52 vote against sustaining the decision of the chair, to include Supreme Court nominations.

Other forms of filibuster
While talking out a measure is the most common form of filibuster in the Senate, other means of delaying and killing legislation are available. Because the Senate routinely conducts business by unanimous consent, one member can create at least some delay by objecting to the request. In some cases, such as considering a bill or resolution on the day it is introduced or brought from the House, the delay can be as long as a day. However, because this is a legislative day, not a calendar day, the majority can mitigate it by briefly adjourning.

In many cases, an objection to a request for unanimous consent will compel a vote. While forcing a single vote may not be an effective delaying tool, the cumulative effect of several votes, which take at least 15 minutes apiece, can be substantial. In addition to objecting to routine requests, senators can force votes through motions to adjourn and through quorum calls. 

Quorum calls are meant to establish the presence or absence of a constitutional quorum, but senators routinely use them to waste time while waiting for the next speaker to come to the floor or for leaders to negotiate off the floor. In those cases, a senator asks for unanimous consent to dispense with the quorum call. 

If another senator objects, the clerk must continue to call the roll of senators, just as they would with a vote. If a call shows no quorum, the minority can force another vote by moving to request or compel the attendance of absent senators. Finally, senators can force votes by moving to adjourn, or by raising specious points of order and appealing the ruling of the chair.

The most effective methods of delay are those that force the majority to invoke cloture multiple times on the same measure. The most common example is to filibuster the motion to proceed to a bill, then filibuster the bill itself. This forces the majority to go through the entire cloture process twice in a row. If, as is common, the majority seeks to pass a substitute amendment to the bill, a further cloture procedure is needed for the amendment.

The Senate was previously particularly vulnerable to serial cloture votes when it and the House have passed different versions of the same bill and want to go to conference (i.e., appoint a conference committee of both chambers to merge the bills). Normally, the majority asks for unanimous consent to:
Insist on its amendment(s), or disagree with the House's amendments
Request, or agree to a request for, a conference
Authorize the presiding officer to appoint conferees
If the minority objects, those motions are debatable (and therefore subject to a filibuster). Additionally, after the first two motions are agreed to, but before the third is, senators can offer an unlimited number of motions to instruct conferees, which are themselves debatable, amendable, and divisible. As a result, a determined minority could previously cause a great deal of delay before a conference. However, in 2013, the Senate amended its rules to allow these three motions to be made together as a compound motion and to provide an expedited cloture procedure on this compound motion. Therefore, this is no longer a viable filibuster tactic.

Longest solo filibusters

Below is a table of the ten longest single-person filibusters to take place in the United States Senate since 1900.

See also 

 Blue slip
 Mr. Smith Goes to Washington, a 1939 film in which a filibuster is a major plot element
 Senate hold
 Senatorial courtesy
 Reconciliation (United States Congress)
 Parks and Recreation (season 6), where Leslie Knope filibusters a council vote in episode 6.
Alfonse D'Amato's filibuster, at C-SPAN

References

Further reading
 
 

Parliamentary procedure
Political campaign techniques
Terminology of the United States Senate
Political terminology of the United States
Filibuster